Zajezierze may refer to the following places in Poland:
Zajezierze, Masovian Voivodeship (east-central Poland)
Zajezierze, Otwock County in Masovian Voivodeship (east-central Poland)
Zajezierze, Pomeranian Voivodeship (north Poland)
Zajezierze, Kartuzy County in Pomeranian Voivodeship (north Poland)
Zajezierze, Warmian-Masurian Voivodeship (north Poland)
Zajezierze, West Pomeranian Voivodeship (north-west Poland)